Xenosocia is a genus of moths belonging to the subfamily Olethreutinae of the family Tortricidae.

Species
Xenosocia acrophora Diakonoff, 1989
Xenosocia argyrtis Diakonoff, 1989
Xenosocia dynastes Diakonoff, 1992
Xenosocia euryptycha Diakonoff, 1989
Xenosocia iocinctis Diakonoff, 1989
Xenosocia lampouris Diakonoff, 1989
Xenosocia panegyrica Diakonoff, 1989
Xenosocia polyschelis Diakonoff, 1989
Xenosocia tryphera Diakonoff, 1989

See also
List of Tortricidae genera

References

External links
Tortricid.net

Tortricidae genera
Eucosmini